St. Joseph is a Roman Catholic church in South Norwalk, Connecticut,  part of the  Diocese of Bridgeport.

History
Saint Joseph's Church was founded in 1895, from the southern portion of Saint Mary's. The first pastor was Rev. John Winters. Winters rented the Music Hall on South Main Street for services. The congregation was Irish, Hungarian, and Italian.

The church's architecture is Gothic Revival, designed by architect Joseph A. Jackson. The cornerstone was laid April 4, 1897.

Present day
At St. Joseph Church in South Norwalk, Mass is conducted in English, Spanish, and French Creole.

References

External links 
 St Joseph - website
 Diocese of Bridgeport

Gothic Revival church buildings in Connecticut
Roman Catholic churches in Norwalk, Connecticut
1895 establishments in Connecticut
Roman Catholic parishes of Diocese of Bridgeport